Weberville is an unincorporated rural community in northern Alberta, Canada. The community hall and volunteer fire department are located on Highway 743 (Weberville Road), 11.5 km (8 mi) north of Highway 2 at Peace River, or 19.8 km (12 mi) east and 3.2 km (2 mi) south of Highway 35 / Highway 986 junction. Most services are located 12 km south in Peace River.

The community is located in census division No. 17 and in the federal riding of Peace River. It is administered by the County of Northern Lights.

History 
The district is named for the first postmaster J.J. (Jack) Weber
The Weberville School district #4380 was formed in 1928 and the schoolhouse built during the winter of 1928-29, the original building still stands behind the community hall.

See also 
List of communities in Alberta

References 

Localities in the County of Northern Lights